The 1953 Latin Cup was the 1st edition of the Latin Cup. It took place at Frontón Recoletos, Madrid, Spain, on April 5-8, 1953 with the participations of Real Madrid, Borletti Milano Milano (champions of the 1951–52 Lega Basket Serie A), ASVEL (champions of the 1951–52 Nationale 1) and Jonction (champions of the 1952–53 Ligue Nationale A). In the Day 3 where the match held the title, Real Madrid won Borletti by 63–58 and became Latin Cup champions.

League stage
Day 1, April 5, 1953

Day 2, April 6, 1953

Day 3, April 8, 1953

References

Latin Cup (basketball)
1952–53 in European basketball
1952–53 in Spanish basketball
1952–53 in Italian basketball
1952–53 in French basketball
International basketball competitions hosted by Spain